This is a demography of the population of Cambodia including population density, ethnicity, education level, health of the populace, economic status, religious affiliations and other aspects of the population.

Population

Between 1874 and 1921, the total population of Cambodia increased from about 946,000 to 2.4 million. By 1950, it had increased to between 3,710,107 and 4,073,967, and in 1962 it had reached 5.7 million. From the 1960s until 1975, the population of Cambodia increased by about 2.2% yearly, the lowest increase in Southeast Asia. 

By 1975 when the Khmer Rouge took power, the population was estimated at 7.3 million. Of this total an estimated one to two million reportedly died between 1975 and 1978. In 1981, the PRK gave the official population figure as nearly 6.7 million, although approximately 6.3 million to 6.4 million is probably more accurate. 

The average annual rate of population growth from 1978 to 1985 was 2.3% (see table 2, Appendix A). A post-Khmer Rouge baby boom pushed the population above 10 million, although growth has slowed in recent years.

In 1959, about 45% of the population was under 15 years of age. By 1962, this had increased slightly to 46%. In 1962, an estimated 52% of the population was between 15 and 64 years of age, while 2% were older than 65. The percentage of males and females in the three groups was almost the same.

Population and age distribution

Structure of the population

Vital statistics

UN estimates

Fertility
The total fertility rate in Cambodia was 3.0 children per woman in 2010. The fertility rate was 4.0 children in 2000. Women in urban areas have 2.2 children on average, compared with 3.3 children per woman in rural areas. Fertility is highest in Mondol Kiri and Rattanak Kiri Provinces, where women have an average of 4.5 children, and lowest in Phnom Penh where women have an average of 2.0 children.

Fertility and Births
Total Fertility Rate (TFR) (Wanted Fertility Rate) and Crude Birth Rate (CBR):

Total fertility rate and other related statistics by province, as of 2014:

Infant and childhood mortality
Childhood mortality rates are decreasing in Cambodia. Currently, the infant mortality rate is 45 deaths per 1,000 live births for the five-year period before the survey compared with 66 deaths reported in the 2005 CDHS and 95 in the 2000 CDHS. Under-five mortality rates have also decreased from 124 deaths per 1,000 live births in 2000, 83 deaths in 2005 to 54 deaths per 1,000 in 2010.

Childhood mortality decreases markedly with mother’s education and wealth. Infant mortality, for example, is twice as high among children whose mothers have no schooling compared to those with secondary or higher education (72 versus 31). The association with wealth is even stronger. There are 77 deaths per 1,000 live births among infants from the poorest households compared to only 23 deaths per 1,000 live births among infants from the richest households.

Mortality rates are much higher in rural than urban areas. Infant mortality, for example, is 64 deaths per 1,000 live births in rural areas compared to only 22 in urban areas.
Mortality also differs by province. Infant mortality ranges from only 13 deaths per 1,000 live births in Phnom Penh to 78 deaths per 1,000 live births in Kampong Chhnang and Svay Rieng.

Life expectancy

In 1959, life expectancy at birth was 44.2 years for males and 43.3 years for females. By 1970, life expectancy had increased by about 2.5 years since 1945. The greater longevity for females apparently reflected improved health practices during maternity and childbirth.

Source: UN World Population Prospects

Ethnic groups

The largest of the ethnic groups in Cambodia are the Khmer, who comprise approximately 90% of the total population and primarily inhabit the lowland Mekong sub region and the central plains.

The Khmer historically have lived near the lower Mekong River in a contiguous arc that runs from the southern Khorat Plateau where modern-day Thailand, Laos and Cambodia meet in the northeast, stretching southwest through the lands surrounding Tonle Sap lake to the Cardamom Mountains, then continues back southeast to the mouth of the Mekong River in southeastern Vietnam.

Ethnic groups in Cambodia other than the politically and socially dominant Khmer are classified as either "indigenous ethnic minorities" or "non-indigenous ethnic minorities". The indigenous ethnic minorities, more commonly collectively referred to as the Khmer Loeu ("upland Khmer"), constitute the majority in the remote mountainous provinces of Ratanakiri, Mondulkiri and Stung Treng and are present in substantial numbers in Kratie Province.

Approximately 17-21 separate ethnic groups, most of whom speak Austroasiatic languages related to Khmer, are included in the Khmer Loeu designation, including the Kuy and Tampuan people. These peoples are considered by the Khmer to be the aboriginal inhabitants of the land. Two of these highland groups, the Rade and the Jarai, are Chamic peoples who speak Austronesian languages descended from ancient Cham. These indigenous ethnic minorities haven't integrated into Khmer culture and follow their traditional animist beliefs.

The non-indigenous ethnic minorities include immigrants and their descendants who live among the Khmer and have adopted, at least nominally, Khmer culture and language. The three groups most often included are the Chinese Cambodians, Vietnamese and Cham peoples. The Chinese have immigrated to Cambodia from different regions of China throughout Cambodia's history, integrating into Cambodian society and today Chinese Cambodians or Cambodians of mixed Sino-Khmer ancestry dominate the business community, politics and the media. The Cham are descendants of refugees from the various wars of the historical kingdom of Champa. The Cham live amongst the Khmer in the central plains but in contrast to the Khmer who are Theravada Buddhists, the vast majority of Cham follow Islam.

There are also small numbers of other minority groups. Tai peoples in Cambodia include the Lao along the Mekong at the northeast border, Thai (urban and rural), and the culturally Burmese Kola, who have visibly influenced the culture of Pailin Province. Even smaller numbers of recent Hmong immigrants reside along the Lao border and various Burmese peoples have immigrated to the capital, Phnom Penh.

Khmer 90%, Vietnamese 5%, Chinese 1%, other 4%.

Languages

Official language

Khmer is an Austroasiatic language spoken by over 90% of the Cambodian population. The vast majority of Khmer speakers use the Central Khmer dialect. Central Khmer is the variety spoken in the central plain where the ethnic Khmers most heavily concentrate. Other Khmer dialects include the Phnom Penh variety, as well as Northern Khmer (Surin Khmer), Western Khmer (Cardamom Khmer), Southern Khmer (Khmer Krom), and the Khmer Khe dialect in Stung Treng province. 

The Northern Khmer dialect is also spoken by over a million Khmers in the southern regions of Northeast Thailand. Western Khmer displays features of the Middle Khmer language, and is considered a conservative dialect. Southern Khmer is the first language of the Khmer Krom people in the Mekong Delta region in Vietnam.

Minority languages
According to Glottolog, 22 languages other than Khmer are spoken in Cambodia, most of which are also Austroasiatic languages. Other Austroasiatic languages of Cambodia include Kuy, Por (Pear), Somray, Chong, Suoy, Sa'och, Tampuan, Kaco', Stieng, Mnong, Brao, Krung (Rade), and Sou (Laven). 

Many of these languages are also spoken in Vietnam. Vietnamese itself is also spoken in parts of Cambodia. Non-Austroasiatic minority languages of Cambodia include Cham and Jarai (Austronesian) as well as Thai and Lao  (Tai-Kadai).

Languages of education
English and French are used to different extents in education.
Sign language
 Cambodian Sign Language

Religions

Buddhism: 97.1%, Islam: 2.0%, Christianity: 0.3%, Others: 0.5%

CIA World Factbook demographic statistics 
The following demographic statistics are from the CIA World Factbook, unless otherwise indicated.

Note: estimates for this country take into account the effects of excess mortality due to AIDS; this can result in lower life expectancy, higher infant mortality, higher death rates, lower population growth rates, and changes in the distribution of population by age and sex than would otherwise be expected (July 2016 est.)

Population growth rate
 1.56% (2016 est.)
 1.698% (2011 est.)
 1.71% (2010 est.)
 1.77% (2009 est.)
 1.75% (2008 est.)

Sex ratio
At birth: 1.05 male(s)/female
0-14 years: 1.02 male(s)/female
15-24 years: 0.98 male(s)/female
25-54 years: 0.96 male(s)/female
55-64 years: 0.65 male(s)/female
65 years and over: 0.6 male(s)/female
Total Population: 0.94 male(s)/female (2016 est.)

Life expectancy at birth
Total population: 64.5 years
Male: 62 years
Female: 67.1 years (2016 est.)

HIV/AIDS
Adult prevalence rate
0.63% (2015 est.)

People living with HIV/AIDS
74,100 (2015 est.)
63,000 (2009 est.)
75,000 (2007 est.)

Deaths
1,000 (2011 est.)
2,000 (2015 est.)
3,100 (2009 est.)
6,900 (2007 est.)

Nationality
Noun: Cambodian(s) or Khmer(s)
Adjective: Cambodian or Khmer

Urbanization

Urban population: 39.4% of total population (2019)
Rate of urbanization: 7.8% annual rate of change (2008—2019)

Literacy
Definition: age 15 and over can read and write

Total population: 88.5%
Male: 91.1%
Female: 86.2% (2019)

Education expenditure
1.9% of GDP (2014)

Diaspora
Countries with notable populations of Cambodians are:

References

 
Society of Cambodia